Portglenone (from  , meaning 'landing place of Eoghan's meadow') is a village and civil parish in County Antrim, Northern Ireland. It lies 8.5 miles (14 km) west of Ballymena. It had a population of 1,174 people in the 2011 Census. Portglenone is beside the smaller village of Glenone (in County Londonderry), from which it is separated by the River Bann.

History 
In 1197, a castle was built there for Norman invader John de Courcy.

Places of interest

Portglenone Forest
Portglenone Forest Park, just outside the village, is classified as an 'Ancient Woodland', and has well marked nature trails, with the River Bann flowing through the forest. There is also a memorial to the United States servicemen stationed there during World War II. The foundations of their Nissen huts can still be seen throughout the wood.

Portglenone Abbey
Portglenone Abbey Church, Our Lady Of Bethlehem Cistercian Monastery, occupies a Georgian mansion (Portglenone House) in the village. In the 1960s a new monastery was built, designed by Padraig Ó Muireadhaigh, which has won several architectural awards.

Gig 'n The Bann Festival
The Gig 'n the Bann is a local cross-community music and dance festival in Portglenone. It takes its name from the River Bann and has been held every year since 1999. Performers have included Paul McSherry and the junior members of Portglenone CCE Branch as well as former members of Déanta.

Demography 
On census day in 2011, Portglenone had a population of 1,174 people (498 households) in the 2011 Census. According  to census retorns, 46.8% were from a Catholic background and 50.6% were from a Protestant background.

Climate

Sport

Portglenone's camogie club won the Ulster senior club championship in 1971, 1972, 1973, 1974, 1977, 1978, 1979, 1982 and 1992. Notable players include Mairead McAtamney.

Notable people
Bernard Diamond, recipient of the Victoria Cross
Emma Kearney, actress (Coronation Street, Emmerdale, Mr. Bhatti on Chutti)

See also
List of civil parishes of County Antrim
List of towns and villages in Northern Ireland
Portglenone Parish Church

References

External links

River Bann, Ireland - Portglenone visitor information

Villages in County Antrim
Civil parishes of County Antrim